Louis Tsatoumas (born 12 February 1982) is a Greek long jumper.

Biography
He won his first major senior medal in 2007 at the European Indoor Athletics Championships, where he claimed the silver medal behind an Italian record-breaking Andrew Howe. On 2 June 2007 in Kalamata Tsatoumas jumped 8.66 metres, achieving a personal best and a Greek record for the event. The performance was the best in the world since Iván Pedroso leaped 8.70 m to win the gold medal at the 1995 World Championships. Tsatoumas ranks as the eighth best long jumper in history and holds the European record in the event at low altitude.

At the 2008 Olympics he had the longest qualifying jump with 8.27 m, but after three consecutive fouls in the final he finished in last place. He was the bronze medallist at both the 2009 Mediterranean Games and 2009 European Team Championships. He represented Greece at the 2009 World Championships in Athletics, reaching the final round, but finished only eleventh overall. At the 2010 European Athletics Championships he was sixth.

In 2014 Tsatoumas set a Greek indoor record of 8.23 m to win the national indoor title.

Personal bests

International competitions

References

External links
 
 
 

1982 births
Living people
Greek male long jumpers
Athletes (track and field) at the 2004 Summer Olympics
Athletes (track and field) at the 2008 Summer Olympics
Athletes (track and field) at the 2012 Summer Olympics
Olympic athletes of Greece
European Athletics Championships medalists
Mediterranean Games gold medalists for Greece
Mediterranean Games bronze medalists for Greece
Athletes (track and field) at the 2009 Mediterranean Games
Athletes (track and field) at the 2013 Mediterranean Games
Mediterranean Games medalists in athletics
People from Messini
Sportspeople from the Peloponnese